Rostov-on-Don Palace of Sports in a multi-purpose indoor arena in Rostov-on-Don, Russia. It is the home of the women's handball club Rostov-Don, one of the top teams of the Russian championship that also regularly plays in the Women's EHF Champions League. Beside handball it also hosts other indoor sports including ice hockey, as well as concerts and other events.

References

Indoor arenas in Russia
Music venues in Russia
Handball venues in Russia
Indoor ice hockey venues in Russia
Sports venues in Rostov-on-Don
1967 establishments in Russia
Sports venues completed in 1967